Young Pushkin  is a 1937 Soviet biopic film directed by Abram Naroditsky. It portrays the youth of the Russian poet Alexander Pushkin.

Cast
 Valentin Litovsky as Alexander Pushkin 
 L. Mazin as Sergey Komovsky  
 Yan Paramonov as Wilhelm Küchelbecker
 Alexander Muruzin as Ivan Pushchin
 Konstantin Smirnov as Mikhail Yakovlev  
 Oleg Lipkin as Anton Delvig
 Cheslav Sushkevich as Alexander Gorchakov
 Vladimir Gardin as Mayer, the tutor  
 Valentina Ivashova as Natasha  
 Nina Shaternikova as Princess  
 Alexander Mgebrov as Gavrila Derzhavin, the poet  
 Ippolit Novskiy as Count Razumovsky, the Minister of Education
 Alexander Gromov as Foma
 Valentin Yantsat as Alexander Petrovich Kunitsyn, Professor of Law  
 Emil Gal as De-Boudrie
 Georgy Kranert as Alexander I of Russia
 Sergey Karnovich-Valois as Aleksey Arakcheyev

References

Bibliography
 Kevin Bartig. Composing for the Red Screen: Prokofiev and Soviet Film. Oxford University Press, 2013.

External links 
 

1937 films
1930s biographical drama films
Soviet biographical drama films
Russian biographical drama films
1930s Russian-language films
Films set in the 19th century
Cultural depictions of Alexander Pushkin
Lenfilm films
Soviet black-and-white films
1937 drama films
Russian black-and-white films
Biographical films about writers
Biographical films about poets